The Ašarėna is a river of  Kėdainiai district municipality, Kaunas County, central Lithuania. It flows for 6.4 kilometres and has a basin area of 8.8 km². It is a left tributary of the Nevėžis.

It starts in the Pašiliai Forest,  from Medekšiai. It meets the Nevėžis next to Pelėdnagiai. There are two ponds on Ašarėna in Pelėdnagiai.

The hydronym possibly derives from Lithuanian word ešerys (or ašarys in local dialect, 'perch'). Its original form could have been *Ešerinė.

References

Rivers of Lithuania
Kėdainiai District Municipality